Agrotis orthogonia, the pale western cutworm, is a moth of the family Noctuidae. The species was first described by Herbert Knowles Morrison in 1876. It is found in North America, more specifically dry, semi-desert areas of western North America from southern Canada to California, ranging eastward nearly to the eastern edge of the Great Plains.

The wingspan is about 34 mm.

The larvae feed on various forbs and grasses. The species is occasionally of economic importance on winter wheat and small grains.  It has also been reported from corn and sugar beets.

Subspecies
Agrotis orthogonia delorata
Agrotis orthogonia duae

References

External links

Agrotis
Moths of North America
Agricultural pest insects
Moths described in 1876